Lakeville is a hamlet and census-designated place (CDP) in the town of Livonia, Livingston County, New York, United States. Its population was 756 as of the 2010 census.

Geography
Lakeville is in northeastern Livingston County, in the northwestern part of the town of Livonia. It sits at the northern end of Conesus Lake, the westernmost of New York's Finger Lakes, where the lake flows out into Conesus Creek, a northward-flowing tributary of the Genesee River. Lakeville is bordered to the south by the Conesus Lake CDP.

U.S. Route 20A passes through the center of Lakeville, leading east  to Livonia village and west  to Geneseo, the Livingston county seat.

Demographics

References

Hamlets in Livingston County, New York
Hamlets in New York (state)
Census-designated places in Livingston County, New York
Census-designated places in New York (state)